Marie-Adélaïde Baubry-Vaillant (1829 – after 1881) was a French painter.   

Baubry-Vaillant was born in Paris and was a pupil of Joseph Nicolas Robert-Fleury and Alphonse Louis Galbrund.

References

Marie-Adélaïde Baubry-Vaillant on artnet

1829 births
Painters from Paris
19th-century French painters
French women painters
19th-century French women artists
Year of death missing